Isla Mosca, is an island in the Gulf of California, located within Bahía Concepción east of the Baja California Peninsula. The island is uninhabited and is part of the Mulegé Municipality.

Biology
Isla Mosca has only one species of reptile, the peninsular leaf-toed gecko (Phyllodactylus nocticolus).

References

Further reading

Islands of the Gulf of California
Islands of Baja California Sur
Uninhabited islands of Mexico